Chromic means of, relating to, or containing chromium.
Chromic acid
Chromic phenomenon
Chromic anhydride
Chromic oxide
chromic chloride